Aplocheilus kirchmayeri is a species of killifish native to India. It was named after the aquarist J. Kirchmayer. Its validity as a species has been questioned, with some experts believing that it is a subspecies of Aplocheilus blockii. The species has been noted to be rather difficult to keep in an aquarium.

Description 
The species is a freshwater fish. Its anal fin has 14 rays and yellow lines. There is a black spot on each of the dorsal fins as well. Markings are present surrounding the eyes and on the mouth.

References 

Fish described in 1986
kirchmayeri
Fish of India